Jane St. John may refer to:
 Jane Martha St. John (1801-1882), English photographer
Jane I. Rignel St. John (1884-1977), American army nurse